Dream Harder (1993) is the sixth album by The Waterboys. Led by Scottish singer-songwriter-instrumentalist Mike Scott, the album features none of the earlier UK-based band members and instead finds Scott backed by American session musicians. It was the last Waterboys album before Scott spent seven years pursuing a formal solo career, with Bring 'Em All In (1995) and Still Burning (1997). The album reached position 171 on the Billboard Top 200 charts, surpassing the previous Waterboys album Room to Roam, in spite of a less-than-enthusiastic response from critics to the album's sound.

The album art was provided by the photography of Michael Halsband and John Hardin and the painting of Pal Shazar, under the direction of Frank Olinsky and Tom Zutaut.

Dream Harder was a return to a rock, or even hard rock, sound after the traditional Celtic-influenced preceding two albums. It did, however, continue The Waterboys' tradition of arranging a William Butler Yeats poem, in this case "Love And Death".  "The Return of Pan" is The Waterboys' second ode to the Greek deity, and the album contains a number of references to the romantic Neopaganism of Dion Fortune and the mystical Christianity of C. S. Lewis, as well as a tribute to guitarist Jimi Hendrix.

Songs
"The New Life", one of many Scott songs which are both optimistic and touch upon spirituality, contains a phrase "Are you under the mercy?", which Scott explains as "a phrase I nicked from a Christian fan who wrote me a letter and signed off with "under the mercy", which I took to mean (and this is what I intended in the song) "under the mercy of spirit/the sacred/the presence of love"  – though Christians would say under the mercy of Christ".

"Glastonbury Song" was released as a single, backed by the songs "Chalice Hill", "Burlington Bertie And Accrington Stanley", and "Corn Circle Symphony". Scott, discussing the song in 2003, described the song as "one of the most commercial, radio-friendly songs musically that I've ever produced", and ascribes its lack of success to its theme, "..the chorus is 'I just found God where He always was'... In many countries it was successful, but in Britain, they wouldn't play it because of the chorus.". James Heflin, the interviewer, notes that the song reached the Top 30 in the UK and was performed live on Top of the Pops broadcast on the BBC. The song was covered by Italian singer-songwriter Samuele Bersani, with new Italian lyrics, released under the title of "Cosa vuoi da me" (What do you want from me?) and included on his 1994 album Freak and released as a single a year later.

"The Return of Pan" was also released as a single, with the songs "Karma" (also the name of one of Scott's earlier musical projects), "Mister Powers" and an untitled track.  "The Return of Pan"'s lyrics recount an episode from Plutarch's "The Obsolescence of Oracles". Plutarch writes that, during the reign of Tiberius, a sailor named Thamus heard the following shouted to him from land; "Thamus, are you there? When you reach Palodes, take care to proclaim that the great god Pan is dead." After retelling the story, the singer of "The Return of Pan" insists that "The Great God Pan is alive!". The single charted at position twenty-four on the UK singles chart May 1993.

"Love and Death" is a poem by William Butler Yeats. It first appeared in the 1885 Dublin University Review.

Reception

Upon release, Neil Spencer of The Observer considered the album to have a sound "dominated by fretboard-throttling rock guitar". He added: "While more appealing to a US audience, the new sound sits oddly with Scott's pagan concerns, but Scott's enthusiasm for thundering tunes and offbeat themes is infectious." Robin Denselow of The Guardian commented: "For all its New Yorkised production sheen, the new album is still Scott-as-hippie-gypsy." He felt most of the songs had a "starchild vein" and a "run-reading ambience".

John Swenson of Rolling Stone felt Dream Harder was the band's "most fully realized album" at the time. Troy J. Augusto of Cash Box selected Dream Harder as his "Pick of the Week" in June 1993. He believed Scott sounded "more confident and emotive than ever", with the album containing a "bold new edge" and "no filler". Augusto concluded: "Remember this one when asked for your 1993 Top 10 list." Jim Farber of Entertainment Weekly described the album as "straight-on rock" and added: "Moments entice, but mostly Dream Harder shows what could've happened to U2 if they never lightened up."

Billboard wrote: "Scott returns to basics with a slightly subdued recap of the style with which he rose to prominence. Problem is that his instrumental foils are largely undistinguished, and sidesteps into folk, middle Eastern and mild reggae don't display much punch." Stephen Thomas Erlewine of AllMusic considered the album to be a return to the "big rock sound of earlier albums like This is the Sea", but felt the material did not "carry the same weight" as the material on the band's previous two albums.

Track listing

Tracks written by Mike Scott, except where noted.

 "The New Life" – 5:08
 "Glastonbury Song" – 3:43
 "Preparing to Fly" – 4:34
 "The Return of Pan" – 4:19
 "Corn Circles" – 4:05
 "Suffer" – 3:49
 "Winter Winter" – 0:33
 "Love and Death" (words: William Butler Yeats, music: Scott) – 2:44
 "Spiritual City" – 3:11
 "Wonders of Lewis" – 2:04
 "The Return of Jimi Hendrix" (words: Scott, music: Scott, Anthony Thistlethwaite, Jim Keltner) – 5:48
 "Good News" – 3:35

Personnel
 Mike Scott – guitar, percussion, rhythm guitar, keyboards, vocals
 Kenny Aaronson – bass guitar on "The New Life" and "Suffer"
 Tawatha Agee – background vocals on "Glastonbury Song"
 Laura Lee Ash – additional background vocals on "Preparing to Fly"
 Carla Azar – drums
 Chris Bruce – lead guitar, rhythm guitar
 Darwin Buschman, M.D. – additional background vocals on "Preparing to Fly"
 James Campagnola – saxophone
 Billy Connolly – voices
 Roger Greenawalt – additional background vocals on "Preparing to Fly"
 Steve Holley – drums on "Corn Circles"
 Bashiri Johnson – conga, drums, tambourine, shaker, talking drum
 Jim Keltner – drums on "The Return of Jimi Hendrix"
 Caroline Lavelle – cello on "Love and Death"
 Cindy Mizelle – background vocals on "Glastonbury Song"
 Jerry Peters – percussion
 Fiona Prendergast – additional background vocals on "Preparing to Fly"
 Thommy Price – drums on "The New Life" and "Suffer"
 Ljubisa "Lubi" Ristic – sitar
 Pal Shazar – background vocals on "Preparing to Fly"
 Jules Shear – background vocals on "Preparing to Fly"
 Brian Stanley – bass guitar on "Corn Circles"
 George Stathos – Greek clarinet
 Fonzi Thornton – background vocals on "Glastonbury Song"
 Scott Thunes – bass guitar
 Terry Wetmore – additional background vocals on "Preparing to Fly"
Technical
Bill Price, Niko Bolas – mixing

Charts

Notes and references

External links

Lyrics at mikescottwaterboys.com
Official forum Chord requests are often fulfilled at "Musician's Corner"

The Waterboys albums
1993 albums
Albums produced by Bill Price (record producer)
Geffen Records albums